Ada Emilia Moldovan (née Bahamet; born 15 November 1983) is a Romanian handball player who plays for Gloria Buzău. She participated at the 2008 Summer Olympics in China with the Romanian national team.

She was given the award of Cetățean de onoare ("Honorary Citizen") of the city of Sebeș in 2011.

International honours 
European Championship: 
Bronze Medalist: 2010

Individual awards
 Liga Naţională Top Scorer: 2008, 2009, 2010

References

 

1983 births
Living people
Sportspeople from Focșani
Romanian female handball players
Olympic handball players of Romania
Handball players at the 2008 Summer Olympics